Claudio Patricio Chavarría Pantoja (born 19 January 1980 in Chile) is a Chilean former footballer who played as a midfielder.

Career
From 1998 to 2001 he played for the German clubs Borussia Dortmund II and SV Straelen.

References

External links
 
 
 
 Claudio Chavarría at playmakerstats.com (English version of ceroacero.es)

1980 births
Living people
People from Temuco
Chilean footballers
Chilean expatriate footballers
Club Deportivo Universidad Católica footballers
Borussia Dortmund II players
SV 19 Straelen players
Puerto Montt footballers
Coquimbo Unido footballers
Rangers de Talca footballers
F.C. Municipal Valencia players
Deportes Temuco footballers
Heredia Jaguares de Peten players
Alianza Atlético footballers
Sportivo Luqueño players
Club Olimpia footballers
Chilean Primera División players
Regionalliga players
Oberliga (football) players
Liga Nacional de Fútbol Profesional de Honduras players
Liga Nacional de Fútbol de Guatemala players
Ecuadorian Serie B players
Peruvian Primera División players
Paraguayan Primera División players
Chilean expatriate sportspeople in Germany
Chilean expatriate sportspeople in Honduras
Chilean expatriate sportspeople in Guatemala
Chilean expatriate sportspeople in Ecuador
Chilean expatriate sportspeople in Peru
Chilean expatriate sportspeople in Paraguay
Expatriate footballers in Germany
Expatriate footballers in Honduras
Expatriate footballers in Guatemala
Expatriate footballers in Ecuador
Expatriate footballers in Peru
Expatriate footballers in Paraguay
Association football midfielders